The 1943 Boston Red Sox season was the 43rd season in the franchise's Major League Baseball history. The Red Sox finished seventh in the American League (AL) with a record of 68 wins and 84 losses, 29 games behind the New York Yankees, who went on to win the 1943 World Series.

The Red Sox set a major league record, which still stands, by playing in 31 extra innings games. In those games, the Red Sox compiled a record of 15 wins and 14 losses, with two ties. They played 73 extra innings in total, equivalent to playing an additional eight 9-inning games.

Offseason 
 Due to wartime considerations, the team held spring training at Tufts University in Medford, Massachusetts.
 Prior to 1943 season: Bill Howerton was signed as an amateur free agent by the Red Sox.

Regular season

Season standings

Record vs. opponents

Opening Day lineup

Roster

Player stats

Batting

Starters by position 
Note: Pos = Position; G = Games played; AB = At bats; H = Hits; Avg. = Batting average; HR = Home runs; RBI = Runs batted in

Other batters 
Note: G = Games played; AB = At bats; H = Hits; Avg. = Batting average; HR = Home runs; RBI = Runs batted in

Pitching

Starting pitchers 
Note: G = Games pitched; IP = Innings pitched; W = Wins; L = Losses; ERA = Earned run average; SO = Strikeouts

Other pitchers 
Note: G = Games pitched; IP = Innings pitched; W = Wins; L = Losses; ERA = Earned run average; SO = Strikeouts

Relief pitchers 
Note: G = Games pitched; W = Wins; L = Losses; SV = Saves; ERA = Earned run average; SO = Strikeouts

Farm system

References

External links
1943 Boston Red Sox team page at Baseball Reference
1943 Boston Red Sox season at baseball-almanac.com

Boston Red Sox seasons
Boston Red Sox
Boston Red Sox
1940s in Boston